Walmer is a town in the district of Dover, Kent, in England. Largely residential, its coastline and castle attract many visitors. It has a population of 6,693 (2001), increasing to 8,178 at the 2011 Census.

Walmer is closely associated with its adjoining neighbour, the town of Deal - sharing many amenities and services and benefiting from Deal's High Street shopping area.

Walmer railway station is on the Kent Coast Line.

History

Julius Caesar
Julius Caesar reputedly landed on the beach here in 55 BC and 54 BC.  It is only one possible landing place, proposed judging from the distances given in his account of the landings in his Gallic Wars. In the 19th century it was thought that he had landed by Deal Castle – hence a house there with SPQR emblazoned on its gate – but in 1907 the landing point has been proposed to be half a mile further south, beyond the lifeboat station, and marked by a concrete memorial. However, new archaeological excavations performed since 2015 suggest instead that the landing occurred in Pegwell Bay, in Thanet, much further north along the coast.

Medieval
The coastal confederation of Cinque Ports during its mediæval period consisted of a confederation of 42 towns and villages in all.
This includes Walmer, as a 'Limb' of Sandwich, Kent.

Walmer Castle

Walmer Castle and its formal gardens are an attraction for visitors. The official residence of Lord Warden of the Cinque Ports since the 18th Century, the building is now an English Heritage property.
Famous Lords Warden have included Queen Elizabeth the Queen Mother, Sir Winston Churchill, William Pitt the Younger (whose niece Lady Hester Stanhope first created the gardens), and the Duke of Wellington (of the Battle of Waterloo fame).  Wellington lived there for 23 years and the castle houses not only a collection of Wellington memorabilia but also the room in which he died.

The Castle was built in 1540 as one of three on this part of the  Kent coast by orders of Henry VIII.  The others were nearby at Deal (southern Deal) and Sandown (north Deal) - the Deal one survives, the Sandown one has been lost to coastal erosion.

Walmer Aerodrome

The flat grassy plateau at Hawkshill Freedown on the southern edge of Walmer parish, adjacent to Walmer Castle, was  requisitioned in April 1917 by the War Office for use as an aerodrome to increase capability for the defence of shipping in the English Channel. Wing Captain C. L. Lambe, Officer Commanding Royal Naval Air Service Dover and Dunkirk posted six pilots from different squadrons who had been involved in intense fighting on the Western Front to Walmer. These pilots were:
Flight Lieutenant Theo Vernon who became Flight Commander
Flight Sub Lieutenant Arthur.R. Brown
Flight Sub Lieutenant J.A. Shaw
Flight Lieutenant Stanley Kemball
Flight Sub Lieutenant William Lusby
Flight Sub Lieutenant Harry Chisam.
Once operational the airmen were kept busy fighting German bomber offensives with many victories recorded. Pilots from the Royal Flying Corps were also stationed at the Aerodrome as the RNAS and RFC often flew together on operations over the Western Front.

September 1917 saw the first death of an Officer who had been stationed at Walmer - Squadron Commander T. C. Vernon of 9 Naval Squadron. He had been the Commanding Officer of the Walmer Defence Flight until July 1917.

In November 1917, 3 Naval Squadron was relocated to Walmer from the Western Front. 4 Naval Squadron arrived 2 January 1918 to take over, then in March 1918, it became the home station of 8 Naval Squadron which was absorbed into the Royal Air Force on its creation on 1 April 1918. 
After a few weeks of reduced activity on base a new Fighter Defence Flight was established in May 1918 with a primary mission to engage enemy fighters originating from Belgium and by 20 October 1918, the Belgium Coast was completely re-occupied by Allied Forces.

On 31 August 1918,  Major Ronald Graham a WW1 ace took command of the newly formed No.233 Squadron RAF this incorporated the Fighter Defence Flight of Camels at RAF Walmer which was then under the command of Captain W. M. Alexander, another Flight (491)at Dover (Guston Road) and the Seaplane flight (407) Dover, Marine Parade. Flight 491 flying DH9s moved to RAF Walmer in January 1919 and in March 1919 the Squadron moved its headquarters to RAF Walmer. 233 Squadron RAF was disbanded in May 1919 but service records show it took a few months for all planes and pilots to leave.

Walmer remained on the emergency landing list of aerodromes.

RAF Walmer (also known as Hawkshill Down) was reopened during the Second World War as a strategic location for the defence of the UK. It was not used operationally for aircraft, but for some of the most important radar tracking and jamming systems used in the Second World War.

In 1941 Chain Home Low was installed at Walmer by the Army to increase the coverage of coastal radar systems in the South East. During 1942 an outstation of No. 80 (Signals) Wing RAF was opened which operated under the control of Bomber Command. In December 1942 A.M.E. type 9000 radar (Oboe) became fully operational which allowed precision bombing using Mosquito aircraft of 109 Squadron RAF. The Oboe system at Walmer worked jointly with a sister station in Norfolk, RAF Trimingham. They were known as cat and mouse stations. Target-finding aircraft controlled by Walmer were used extensively during the Battle of the Ruhr in March 1943. Oboe was one of the most precise navigational systems employed by any Air Force in the Second World War.
 
Large numbers of personnel were based at Walmer during this period including many from the WAAF (Women's Auxiliary Air Force). In October 1943 a detachment from 2752 Squadron RAF Regiment (anti-aircraft) was deployed to Walmer followed by the full squadron in June 1944. Servicemen from both 2852 and 2844 Squadrons RAF Regiments were recorded as serving at Walmer. From December 1943 until October 1944 Walmer was the site for the second station for an RAF jammer system (Grocer) which was used against German Air Force airborne interception radar (Lichtenstein). The transmitters and monitor were placed strategically at Walmer and further south at Kingsdown so as to not interfere with the work of Oboe. Twin Browning machine guns were used for the defence of the site throughout this period.

From June 1942 until 31 December 1944 Walmer was also used by M Balloon unit of the RAF for propaganda flights with the HQ at a house in St Clare Road (now Generals Meadow) which was used during the First World War as a military hospital. During February 1944 over 5,000,000 leaflets were dropped over Germany and France by 2,478 balloons released from Walmer.

In 1945 RAF Walmer/Hawkshill Down was closed and it returned to agricultural use.

On 12 August 2017 a new commemorative stand was placed on the Freedown on a site looking out over the English Channel. The stand was unveiled by the current Lord Warden of the Cinque Ports Admiral of the Fleet The Lord Boyce KG GCB OBE DL at a service led by the Vicar of Walmer and supported by the Chaplain of the Fleet and the Deputy Chaplain in Chief of the RAF. The new stand lists sixteen officers stationed at Walmer during the First World War and who lost their lives on active service. It also gives the history of the site during two World Wars.

A wooden memorial had been placed on the site of the airfield in 1920 under the direction of the Countess of Beauchamp, wife of the then Lord Warden of the Cinque Ports. The location of the memorial has been changed a number of times, with the last site being on private land. There is very little of the original remaining.

In 2019, the VintageAirRally tried to organise the landing, at Walmer of the only De Havilland 9 still flying in the world. The DH9 was the last plane to fly out in 1919 and it was probably piloted by Harry Chisam, whose service records show he was stationed at Walmer in June 1919. Due to the height of trees now surrounding the area this was found to be impossible.

The Walmer Brewery 1816–1978

It is believed that Upper Walmer was home to a brewery from Tudor times and possibly earlier. In 1816 a small brewery on the Dover Road just south of the old Walmer Village was acquired by Edmund Thompson who then operated it as Thompson & Sons. In 1867 John Matthews bought the business and greatly expanded and modernised it, although he retained the Thompson Brewery name.

The development of maltings, bottling plants, brew house, stables and blacksmith's eventually made it an important local employer. Further houses were bought in Dover Road for use as offices and to house staff, and a long terrace of brick cottages was built in Belmont to house more workers.

During the 1950s, the brewery became part of the Charrington's company and its role was reduced to a bottling and distribution plant. It eventually closed in 1972 and was demolished in 1978 to make way for a housing development called Downlands. An old bell, once housed in the belfry at the brewery, was re-sited at The Thompson Bell, the last remaining public house in the village.

Governance
An electoral ward in the same name exists. The population of this ward at the 2011 census was 7,434.

Churches
Old St Mary's Church, Walmer
St Saviour's Church, Walmer
St Mary's Church, Walmer

People from Walmer
People born in Walmer include:
 Dornford Yates
 John Hassall (illustrator)
 Roy Stevens, cricketer
People who died in Walmer include:
 Arthur Wellesley, 1st Duke of Wellington
 Joseph Lister, 1st Baron Lister

Lifeboats

References

External links

 Walmer Parish Council
 Walmer community website

Populated coastal places in Kent
Beaches of Kent
Civil parishes in Kent
Dover District